"Love Is the Message" is a 1974 song by MFSB featuring vocals by The Three Degrees, written by Gamble and Huff and the follow up to their #1 hit TSOP (The Sound of Philadelphia). It reached #85 on the Billboard Hot 100.

Weekly charts

References

1974 singles
MFSB songs
Philadelphia International Records singles
Songs written by Leon Huff
Songs written by Kenny Gamble
1974 songs